Garden Expo Station, is a station on Line 7 of the Wuhan Metro. It entered revenue service on October 1, 2018. It is located in Qiaokou District.

Station layout

Gallery

References

Wuhan Metro stations
Line 7, Wuhan Metro
Railway stations in China opened in 2018